Hugues Fabrice Zango (born 25 June 1993) is a Burkinabé athlete who specialises in the triple jump and the long jump. Pending ratification, he is the world indoor record holder in the triple jump with a jump of  set in 2021. Zango competed at the 2016 Summer Olympics in Rio de Janeiro, Brazil, and won the bronze medal at the 2020 Summer Olympics in Tokyo, Japan, in the triple jump event, the first ever Olympic medal for Burkina Faso. He has also competed in World Championships, two African athletics championships, a Jeux de la Francophonie, two Summer Universiades and two African Games.
He became the first-ever medalist for Burkina Faso with a bronze medal and African record at the 2019 World Athletics Championships in Doha.

Competition
Zango's debut at an international athletics competition was at the 2013 Summer Universiade, where he competed in the triple jump. In the qualification round his best jump was 15.74 metres, a distance that qualified him for the final. Zango finished sixth with a jump of 15.96 metres in the final. His jump was 1.05 metres smaller than the jump of gold medalist, Ukrainian Viktor Kuznyetsov, and 61 centimetres smaller than the bronze medalist, Kazakhstani Yevgeniy Ektov.

Also in 2013 was the 2013 Jeux de la Francophonie. At the 2013 Jeux de la Francophonie, Zango competed in the triple jump. He jumped 15.97 metres to finish tenth in a twelve-athlete field.

Zango's next major competition was the 2015 Summer Universiade, where he competed in both the long jump and the triple jump. In the long jump, Zango's best jump was 6.73 metres, a distance that placed him 30th in qualification, out of 36 athletes. He did not qualify for the final. In the triple jump, Zango qualified for the final after jumping a distance of 16.59 metres in the qualification round. In the final, Zango jumped 16.76 metres, a distance that won him the silver medal. Zango's jump was 53 centimetres smaller than the gold-medalist's (Russian Dmitriy Sorokin's) jump of 17.29 metres. Zango jumped the same distance as bronze medalist Xu Xiaolong (China) but, as Zango's second best jump was further than Xiaolong's, Zango won the silver medal on count back. Zango was Burkina Faso's only medalist at the 2015 Summer Universiade.

Zango competed at the 2015 World Championships in the triple jump. In the competition, all three of his jumps were fouls and therefore he recorded no mark (NM). Zango then competed in the 2015 African Games. Zango finished fifth in the triple jump with a jump of 16.36 metres. Zango was 19 centimetres behind the bronze medalist, Mamadou Chérif Dia of Mali. At the 2016 African Athletics Championships, Zango won the silver medal in the triple jump. He jumped 16.81 metres, which was 32 centimetres less than the distance jumped by the gold medalist, Nigerian Tosin Oke. Zango jumped four centimetres further than the bronze medalist, Godfrey Khotso Mokoena of South Africa, and 20 centimetres further than the fourth-placed athlete, Mauritian Jonathan Drack.

2016 Summer Olympics
At the 2016 Summer Olympics, Zango competed in the triple jump. Zango jumped 15.99 metres in the qualification round. His jump was the 34th best out of 47 athletes. Zango's jump was 62 centimetres less than the shortest jump by an athlete that qualified for the final, Cuban Lázaro Martínez. Therefore, Zango was eliminated from the competition.

2019 World Championships
Before the 2019 World Championships in Doha, Burkina Faso's best Athletics World Championship result was 10th place for Franck Zio in the long jump at the 1995 World Championships in Gothenburg. Qualifying for the final in Doha, Zango performed consistently well with 17.46 m in round 2 and 17.56 m in round 5, before setting a new African Record with a distance of 17.66 m in the sixth and final round. With this record, Zango claimed the bronze medal - his (and Burkina Faso's) first at a major championship.

2020 Summer Olympics
In the 2020 Summer Olympics, held in 2021, Zango won the bronze medal (and so far the only one for his country in the Olympics) in the men's triple jump with a distance of 17.47 meters. He qualified for the final with a distance of 16.83 meters in the earlier heats. Going into the event, he was ranked fourth in the world and had a personal and season best of 18.07 meters. This was Burkina Faso's first Olympic medal, and Zango earned it on 5 Aug, Burkina's Independence Day.

Indoor world record
On 16 Jan 2021, in his final attempt jumping at a jumps-only indoor meet in Aubière, France, Zango jumped  to improve his coach, Teddy Tamgho's Indoor World Record by 15 cm. He became the first world record holder from Burkina Faso and the first African to hold a world record in a jumping event. The jump ranks him the 6th performer in history, indoors or outdoors.

Personal bests

All information taken from IAAF profile.

Competition record

Personal life
Zango graduated with a Master's degree in Electronics, Electrical energy, and Automation from the University of Artois (Hauts-de-France, France) in 2018. Subsequently, he is working on a PhD degree in electrical engineering at the same university.  He expects to complete the degree in 2022.

Notes

References

External links

1993 births
Living people
Sportspeople from Ouagadougou
Burkinabé male triple jumpers
Burkinabé long jumpers
Olympic male triple jumpers
Olympic athletes of Burkina Faso
Athletes (track and field) at the 2016 Summer Olympics
World Athletics Championships athletes for Burkina Faso
World Athletics Championships medalists
Athletes (track and field) at the 2015 African Games
Universiade medalists in athletics (track and field)
Universiade medalists for Burkina Faso
Athletes (track and field) at the 2019 African Games
African Games medalists in athletics (track and field)
African Games gold medalists for Burkina Faso
African Championships in Athletics winners
African Games gold medalists in athletics (track and field)
Medalists at the 2015 Summer Universiade
Medalists at the 2017 Summer Universiade
Athletes (track and field) at the 2020 Summer Olympics
Medalists at the 2020 Summer Olympics
Olympic bronze medalists for Burkina Faso
Olympic bronze medalists in athletics (track and field)
21st-century Burkinabé people